Prismosticta is a genus of moths of the family Endromidae first described by Arthur Gardiner Butler in 1880. The genus was previously placed in the subfamily Prismostictinae of the family Bombycidae.

Species
Prismosticta fenestrata Butler, 1880
Prismosticta hyalinata Butler, 1885
Prismosticta microprisma Zolotuhin & Witt, 2009
Prismosticta regalis Zolotuhin & Witt, 2009
Prismosticta tianpinga X. Wang, G.H. Huang & M. Wang, 2011
Prismosticta tiretta Swinhoe, 1903

References

 
Endromidae